Geoffrey Tyler  (born 10 June 1920 – 28 April 2012) was an English educationalist.

He was born in Ilford, Essex. A keen composer and singer, he has published books of songs for children.

Education 
He attended Ilford County High School, Manchester University and  University College, Oxford.

Career 
 Armament Supply Officer, Admiralty HQ, 1938–46
 Assistant Master, Barrow Grammar School, 1951–53
 Administrative Assistant, School of Education, Manchester University, 1953–55
 Professional Assistant, Cheshire LEA, 1956–57
 Assistant Education Officer (Schools), Wiltshire LEA, 1957–61
 Further Education Officer, Buckinghamshire LEA, 1961–65
 Vice-Principal, Mid-Essex Technical College, Chelmsford, 1965–69
 Principal, Ealing Technical College, London, 1969–75
 Director, East Sussex College of Higher Education, 1976–78
 Associate Director, Brighton Polytechnic, 1978–79
 Governor, then Vice-Chairman, then Chairman, Eastbourne College of Further Education, 1979–93
 Chairman of Corporation, Eastbourne College of Arts and Technology, 1993–2001
 Vice-Chairman, Sussex Downs College, 2001–2007
 Appointed OBE, 2004

References 
 Who's Who, 2006

1920 births
2012 deaths
People from Ilford
People educated at Ilford County High School
Alumni of the University of Manchester
Alumni of University College, Oxford
Schoolteachers from Essex
Officers of the Order of the British Empire
People associated with the University of Brighton